, also known as Wada Yasushi, was a Japanese mathematician in the Edo period.  His birth name was Kōyama Naoaki; but he changed his name to Wada Nei, by which he became more widely known.

Life and work
Wada studied under the patronage of the hereditary    in the court of the emperor.

Wada became a student of Kusaka Sei, who had been a student of Ajima Chokuyen. Wada extended Ajima Chokuyen's development of an integral calculus within the Enri ("circle principle") context. He worked on the computation of minimum and maximum values (roughly by equating the first derivative to 0) and gave reasoning and insight to the computation method that was given without explanation by Seki Takakazu about 100 years earlier. He was also the first Japanese mathematician to study roulettes.

Selected works
Wada's published writings are few.

  OCLC 22035715224

See also
 Sangaku, the custom of presenting mathematical problems, carved in wood tablets, to the public in shinto shrines
 Soroban, a Japanese abacus
 Japanese mathematics

Notes

References 
 Endō Toshisada (1896). . Tōkyō: _.  OCLC 122770600
 Restivo, Sal P. (1992).  Mathematics in Society and History: Sociological Inquiries. Dordrecht: Kluwer Academic Publishers. ;   OCLC 25709270
 David Eugene Smith and Yoshio Mikami. (1914).   A History of Japanese Mathematics. Chicago: Open Court Publishing.   OCLC 1515528 -- note alternate online, full-text copy at archive.org
 Isaac Titsingh. (1834). Nihon Odai Ichiran; ou,  Annales des empereurs du Japon.  Paris: Royal Asiatic Society, Oriental Translation Fund of Great Britain and Ireland.  OCLC 5850691

19th-century Japanese mathematicians
Japanese writers of the Edo period
1787 births
1840 deaths